Jermaine R. “Huggy” Hopkins (born August 23, 1973) is an American television and film actor. Hopkins is best known for his roles as Dupree on The WB sitcom The Wayans Bros. from 1996 to 1998, and as Thomas Sams in the 1989 film, Lean on Me, Eric "Steel" Thurman in the 1992 crime drama thriller Juice, Benny King in the 1996 film Phat Beach and Kilo in the 1997 comedy film Def Jam's How to Be a Player.

Career
Born in Elizabeth New Jersey, Hopkins began his acting career as a teenager. At age 15, Hopkins fell into the acting business when his mother brought him to a casting-call audition in New York for the Warner Bros. feature Lean on Me, in which he got a starring role opposite Morgan Freeman as Thomas Sams, a misguided drug-abusing high school student. His next project Juice, directed by Ernest R. Dickerson, had him starring as Steel alongside Khalil Kain, Omar Epps, and Tupac Shakur.

Hopkins subsequently starred in the HBO worldwide release Strapped, that would be Forest Whitaker's directorial debut. Over the next two years, Hopkins appeared in episodes of Murder One and Moesha, and six episodes as Dupree on The WB's The Wayans Bros. series, before finishing production on his next film Def Jam's How to Be a Player, starring opposite Bill Bellamy and comedian Pierre Edwards.

Legal Issues
Hopkins was arrested on December 15, 2011, for attempting to purchase  of marijuana from an undercover cop. He previously faced up to five years in prison, but was sentenced to 30 days in jail and three years' probation. TMZ reports Hopkins pled guilty to felony possession. However, the judge suspended his four-month sentence, instead giving Hopkins 24 months of supervised probation.

Filmography

Film

Television

References

External links
 

1975 births
Living people
African-American male actors
Male actors from New Jersey
American male child actors
American male film actors
21st-century African-American people
20th-century African-American people